Tyra may refer to:

Places
Tyra Field, a gas field in the North Sea
Tyra West – F3 pipeline, a pipeline running from Tyra Field
Tyra (Třinec), a village near Třinec, Czech Republic, now administratively a part of this town
 Tyra river, alternative name for the Dniester

People
Tyra (given name)
Tyra (surname)

See also
Tayra
Thyra
Tira (disambiguation)
Tyr
Tyras
Tyro

Disambiguation pages with given-name-holder lists